The Secret History of the Mongols (Middle Mongol:  Mongɣol‑un niɣuca tobciyan; Traditional Mongolian:  Mongɣol‑un niɣuca tobcii'a, Khalkha Mongolian: ,) is the oldest surviving literary work in the Mongolian language. It was written for the Mongol royal family some time after the 1227 death of Genghis Khan (born Temujin). The author is anonymous and probably originally wrote in the Mongolian script, but the surviving texts all derive from transcriptions or translations into Chinese characters that date from the end of the 14th century and were compiled by the Ming dynasty under the title The Secret History of the Yuan Dynasty. Also known as Tobchiyan ( or ) in the History of Yuan.

The Secret History is regarded as the single most significant native Mongolian account of Genghis Khan. Linguistically, it provides the richest source of pre-classical Mongolian and Middle Mongolian. The Secret History is regarded as a piece of classic literature in both Mongolia and the rest of the world.

Content 

The work begins with a semi-mythical genealogy of Genghis Khan (also called Temüjin). According to legend a blue-grey wolf and a fallow doe begat the first Mongol, named Batachiqan. Eleven generations after Batachiqan, a widow named Alan Gua was abandoned by her in-laws and left with her two boys Bügünütei and Belgünütei. She then bore three more sons with a supernatural glowing man who came in through the smoke-hole at the top of the yurt. The youngest of Alan Gua’s three divinely-born children was Bodonchar, founder of the Borjigin. The description of Temüjin's life begins with the kidnapping of his mother, Hoelun, by his father Yesügei. It then covers Temüjin's early life following his birth around 1160; the difficult times after the murder of his father; and the many conflicts against him, wars, and plots before he gains the title of Genghis Khan (Universal Ruler) in 1206. The latter parts of the work deal with the campaigns of conquest of Genghis and his third son Ögedei throughout Eurasia; the text ends with Ögedei's reflections on what he did well and what he did wrong. It relates how the Mongol Empire was created.

It contains 12 chapters:
 Temüjin's origin and childhood.
 Temüjin's teenage years.
 Temujin destroys the Merkit and takes the title Genghis Khan.
 Genghis Khan struggles against Jamukha and Tayichiud.
 Genghis Khan destroys the Tatars and tangles with Ong Khan
 Destruction of the Khereid
 The fate of Ong Khan
 Escape of Kuchlug and a defeat of Jamukha.
 Establishment of the empire and imperial guard.
 Conquest of the Uyghur and forest peoples.
 Conquest of the Jin dynasty, the Western Xia, Persia, Baghdad and Russia
 Temüjin's death and Ögedei's reign.

Several passages of the Secret History appear in slightly different versions in the 17th-century Mongolian chronicle Altan Tobchi ("Golden Summary").

Value 
Scholars of Mongolian history consider the text hugely important for the wealth of information it contains on the ethnography, language, literature and varied aspects of the Mongol culture. In terms of its value to the field of linguistic studies, it is considered unique among the Mongol texts as an example free from the influence of Buddhism prevalent in later texts. It is especially valued for its vivid and realistic depictions of daily tribal life and organization of Mongol civilization in the 12th and 13th centuries, complementing other primary sources available in the Persian and Chinese languages.

Its value as a historically accurate source is more controversial: whereas some experts, such as René Grousset, assess it positively in this regard as well, others, such as Igor de Rachewiltz, believe that the value of the source lies primarily in its "faithful description of Mongol tribal life", and Arthur Waley even claimed that the Secret History's "historical value [is] almost nil".

Discovery and translations 

The only surviving copies of the work are transcriptions of older, presumably original Mongolian texts with Chinese characters, accompanied by a (somewhat shorter) in-line glossary and a translation of each section into Chinese. In China, the work had been well known as a text for teaching Chinese to read and write Mongolian since the Ming dynasty, and the Chinese translation was used in several historical works, but by the 1800s, copies had become very rare.

Baavuday Tsend Gun (1875–1932) was the first Mongolian scholar to transcribe The Secret History of the Mongols into modern Mongolian, in 1915–17. The first to discover the Secret History for the West and offer a translation from the Chinese glossary was the Russian sinologist Palladiy Kafarov in 1866. The first translations from the reconstructed Mongolian text were done by the German sinologist Erich Haenisch (edition of the reconstructed original text: 1937; of the translation: 1941, second edition 1948) and Paul Pelliot (ed. 1949).  Tsendiin Damdinsüren translated the chronicle into Khalkha Mongolian in 1947. B. I. Pankratov published a translation into Russian in 1962.

Arthur Waley published a partial translation of the Secret History, but the first full translation into English was by Francis Woodman Cleaves, The Secret History of the Mongols: For the First Time Done into English out of the Original Tongue and Provided with an Exegetical Commentary. The archaic language adopted by Cleaves was not satisfying to all and, between 1972 and 1985, Igor de Rachewiltz published a fresh translation in eleven volumes of the series Papers on Far Eastern History accompanied by extensive footnotes commenting not only on the translation but also various aspects of Mongolian culture. (Brill Publishers released de Rachewiltz' edition as a two-volume set in 2003.) In 2015, de Rachewiltz published an open access version of his previous translation, The Secret History of the Mongols: A Mongolian Epic Chronicle of the Thirteenth Century, that is a full translation but omits the extensive footnotes of his previous translations.
The Secret History of the Mongols has been published in translation in over 30 languages by researchers.

In 2004 the Government of Mongolia decreed that a copy of The Secret History of the Mongols covered with golden plates was to be located to the rear part of the Government building.

References

Notes

Citations

Sources 

 
 
 
 Igor de Rachewiltz (11 December 2015). The Secret History of the Mongols: A Mongolian Epic Chronicle of the Thirteenth Century .

External links 

 The Secret History of the Mongols: full text, history, translations into Russian, English, French, Bulgarian, Spanish and Czech, original transliteration (Mirror)
 transcription with flexional morpheme boundaries and other additional annotation by John Street
 The Secret History of the Mongols: partial text
 Timothy May: Extensive review of the publication of Rachewiltz's translation and notes September 2004
 Lingua Mongolia: first 21 paragraphs of the Secret History in Chinese transcription, Pinyin, and Traditional Mongolian script
 Modern Mongolian Version (and audio files) -ELibrary.MN
 

13th-century books
13th-century history books
History books about Mongolia
Mongolian literature
Biographies (books)
Epics
Works of unknown authorship
History of Mongolia
Genghis Khan